Carras may refer to:

Porto Carras, northern Greece Resort
Yiannis Carras (1907-1989), shipowner

See also 
Karras

Greek-language surnames